Post Mountain is an unincorporated community and census-designated place (CDP) in Trinity County, California, United States. Its population is 3,032 as of the 2020 census. Post Mountain was not listed as a CDP prior to the 2020 census.

References 

Census-designated places in Trinity County, California
Census-designated places in California